Pchyolkino is a rural locality (a village) in Volosatovskoye Rural Settlement, Selivanovsky District, Vladimir Oblast, Russia. The population was 8 as of 2010.
date=2014-07-21 }}. </ref>

Geography 
Pchyolkino is located 10 km north of Krasnaya Gorbatka (the district's administrative centre) by road. Lukoyanikha is the nearest rural locality.

References 

Rural localities in Selivanovsky District